The Itakpe mine is a large iron mine located in central Nigeria in the Kogi State. Itakpe represents one of the largest iron ore reserves in Nigeria and in the world having estimated reserves of 3 billion tonnes of ore grading 32% iron metal.

References 

Iron mines in Nigeria
Economy of Kogi State